Boston Regional Medical Center (often abbreviated to "Boston Regional" or "BRMC") was a 187-bed hospital located in Stoneham, Massachusetts. Previously known as New England Sanitarium and Hospital and later New England Memorial Hospital (in both instances a Seventh-day Adventist medical facility), it was located within the Middlesex Fells Reservation along Woodland Road in Stoneham, Massachusetts, until it closed in February 1999 for financial reasons.

Before its use as a hospital, the buildings formed the Langwood Hotel, operated during the 1880s by George F. Butterfield.

Murder
Dr. Linda Goudey, an obstetrician who worked at New England Memorial Hospital, was strangled to death in her car in the hospital's parking lot.

References

External links

Stoneham, Massachusetts
Hospitals in Middlesex County, Massachusetts
Former Seventh-day Adventist institutions